Narty may refer to the following places:
Narty, Włocławek County in Kuyavian-Pomeranian Voivodeship (north-central Poland)
Narty, Rypin County in Kuyavian-Pomeranian Voivodeship (north-central Poland)
Narty, Łódź Voivodeship (central Poland)
Narty, Radom County in Masovian Voivodeship (east-central Poland)
Narty, Sochaczew County in Masovian Voivodeship (east-central Poland)
Narty, Warmian-Masurian Voivodeship (north Poland)
Also translates as great hero.